Eretmocera katangensis is a moth of the family Scythrididae. It was described by Bengt Å. Bengtsson in 2014. It is found in the Democratic Republic of the Congo (Katanga).

References

katangensis
Moths described in 2014
Moths of Africa